Aung Kyaw Moe (born 2 July 1982) is a professional football player from Myanmar. He plays for Yadanabon in the Myanmar National League and also for the Myanmar national team. He plays as a midfielder. He was Man of the Match for the MNL Cup Grand royal 2009.

International goals

References

 

1982 births
Living people
Burmese footballers
Myanmar international footballers
Yadanarbon F.C. players
Association football midfielders